Robert Fabbri may refer to:

 Robby Fabbri (born 1996), Canadian ice hockey player
 Roberto Fabbri (born 1964), Italian guitarist